Etzioni is a surname. Notable people with the surname include:

Amitai Etzioni (born 1929), Israeli-American sociologist
Danny Etzioni (born 1959), Israeli footballer
Marvin Etzioni, American singer, mandolinist, bassist and record producer
Oren Etzioni (born 1964), American computer scientist and entrepreneur
Ruth Etzioni, biostatistician 
Other:
Etzioni Brigade, Israeli infantry brigade

See also
Etzioni Brigade